Tseraskiy (Ceraski) is an impact crater on the Moon's far side, approximately  in diameter. It is located to the north-northeast of the huge walled plain Planck, and to the southeast of the crater Pauli. To the east-northeast of Tseraskiy is Crocco.

This is an eroded crater formation and the outer rim has been steady worn down to a roughly circular ridge with rounded edges. This crater overlies an older crater along the southwest side. There is a small crater along the exterior of the rim to the northeast. The interior floor is relatively level and is marked by several small and tiny craterlets, particularly in the western half.

In some publications name has been spelt as Ceraski.

Satellite craters

By convention these features are identified on lunar maps by placing the letter on the side of the crater midpoint that is closest to Tseraskiy.

See also 
 Asteroid 807 Ceraskia

References 

 
 
 
 
 
 
 
 
 
 
 
 

Impact craters on the Moon